Atalar may refer to:

 Atalar, Çüngüş
 Atalar, Şavşat, village in Artvin Province, Turkey
 Atalar, Tarsus, town in Mersin Province, Turkey
 Atalar, Iran, village in Golestan Province, Iran
 Abdullah Atalar, Turkish scientist and academic

Turkish-language surnames